Khandesh District (or Kandesh, Khandeish) was a  district, administrative division of Bombay presidency of British India under British rule, which includes the present-day Jalgaon, Dhule and Nandurbar districts of Maharashtra.

In the 18th and early 19th centuries, Khandesh was part of the Maratha Confederacy, and was ruled by the Maratha Peshwa. The district was annexed to British India at the conclusion of the Third Anglo-Maratha War in 1818. A southern portion of the district was detached to form Nashik District in 1869. In 1906 the district was divided into East Khandesh and West Khandesh districts, with their capitals at Jalgaon and Dhulia (Dhule), respectively.  East Khandesh was later renamed Jalgaon District, and West Khandesh, later renamed Dhule District, was split in Dhule and Nandurbar districts in 1998.

History 
In the Mughal rule of Aurangzeb, in 1670 Daud Khan was Subhadar of Khandesh province. Khandesh district was part of Khandesh province. Burhanpur was its capital city. The Asirgarh fort was known as the gate of Southern India  , and Burhanpur was known as "Dakkhan ka Darwaza".

Administration 
Dhule  was the administrative center of Khandesh district.

On north west corner of the district Narmada river was natural border of the district and in west the base of the hills out skirt in Shahada was natural border of Khandesh. It separated Khandesh from Akrani territory that was present at north right into the hart of the hills where from Narmada river pass Satpuda. On east and south east rows of pillars and some water streams was mark the boundary of Khandesh from central provinces and Berar. To the south Ajanta, Satmala range was rough boundary between Khandesh and Nizam's territory. On south west Arva or Making, Galna hills separate Khandesh from Nasik.

For administrative purposes the British government distributed Khandesh into 16 sub divisions. Of these subdivision Amalner, Pimpalner, Pachora, Bhusaval, Savada had two petty divisions other each had  one petty division.

References

Sources
 Hunter, Sir William Wilson, et al. (1908). Imperial Gazetteer of India, Volume 15. 1908–1931; Clarendon Press, Oxford.

Districts of British India
History of Maharashtra by district
History of Maharashtra
Jalgaon district
Bhusawal
Dhule district
Nandurbar district